Tim Dyson (born 1949) is a British demographer with a focus on Indian population history. He is currently Professor Emeritus of Population Studies at the London School of Economics. He was elected as a Fellow of the British Academy in 2001.

Bibliography
 A Population History of India: From the First Modern People to the Present Day. Oxford University Press, 2018.
 Population and Development: The Demographic Transition. Zed Books, 2010.
 Twenty-first Century India: Population, Economy, Human Development, and the Environment, eds. Tim Dyson, Robert Cassen, Leela Visaria.
 Famine Demography: Perspectives from the Past and Present. Oxford University Press, 2002.
 Population and Food: Global Trends and Future Prospects. Psychology Press, 1996.
 India's demography: essays on the contemporary population. 1982.

See also
 List of fellows of the British Academy elected in the 2000s

References

External links 
 British Academy Fellow
 Academic Profile

1949 births
Living people
British demographers
Academics of the London School of Economics
Fellows of the British Academy